Raphael Meyuchas ben Shmuel (1695?-1771) served as Chief Rabbi of Israel (Rishon l’Zion) from 1756 until his death in 1771.

Meyuchas was born in Jerusalem to the Meyuchas family. His brother was Avraham ben Shmuel Meyuchas. His son was Moshe Yosef Mordechai Meyuchas.

Meyuchas attempted to negotiate a reconciliation between the Karaites and other Jews, and tried to gain admission to Jewish schools for Karaite children.  His books include Minchat Bikkurim (Salonika, 1752) a commentary on the Talmud, and  Peri ha-Adamah, (Salonika 1752–57, 4 volumes) a commentary on Maimonides's Mishneh Torah.

References

Meyuchas ben Shmuel, Raphael
Meyuchas ben Shmuel, Raphael
1690s births
1771 deaths